James Laurenson (born 17 February 1940) is a New Zealand stage and screen actor.

Early life 
Laurenson was born in Marton, North Island, New Zealand. He was a student at Canterbury University College in Christchurch (now University of Canterbury) where he was directed by Dame Ngaio Marsh, notably in the title role in Macbeth at the Civic Theatre Christchurch in 1962.

He moved to the UK in the mid-1960s and made his film debut in 1969 with a small part in Women in Love, although he also had an uncredited part (as an Oxford rower, playing alongside Graham Chapman) in The Magic Christian.

Career 
He has appeared in numerous British Shakespearean productions, notably Richard II, as Rosencrantz in Hamlet, and on radio in the marathon series, Vivat Rex. He also appeared as Piers Gaveston in the 1970 production of Christopher Marlowe's Edward II, opposite Ian McKellen who later recalled that kissing Laurenson "was a bonus throughout the run". Other costume roles included a French courtier in Elizabeth R and the Earl of Lincoln in Shadow of the Tower (1972). 

That same year (1972), he took on a more modern role starring as Det. Inspector Napoleon "Boney" Bonaparte in the Australian TV drama series Boney, playing a half-Aboriginal detective. This would be his most high-profile part, although the casting of a non-Aboriginal in the role was attacked by some Australian critics. 

In 1974, he took the lead role in the TV film The Prison, based on the novel by Georges Simenon, the first instalment in the Thames Television/Euston Films series Armchair Cinema. He also starred as Pink's Father in the 1982 film, Pink Floyd—The Wall.

Laurenson took the lead role of Julian Marsh in the West End production of Gower Champion's musical 42nd Street at the Theatre Royal, Drury Lane, in 1984, his only role in a musical. He made another notable stage appearance at Greenwich Theatre in Falling Over England with Charlotte Cornwell.

Throughout his career, Laurenson has had guest roles in numerous popular TV series such as Z-Cars, Space: 1999, The Professionals, Armchair Thriller, Hammer House of Horror, Remington Steele, Cagney and Lacey, Hammer House of Mystery and Suspense, Inspector Morse, Bergerac, Boon, Lovejoy, Prime Suspect, Sharpe, A Touch of Frost, Heartbeat, Silent Witness, Taggart, Midsomer Murders, State of Play, Hustle, Endeavour and Spooks.

Laurenson has had many appearances on BBC Radio, including the role of the Squire of Altarnun in the 1991 adaptation of Daphne Du Maurier's Jamaica Inn.

In 2012, he played the Earl of Westmoreland in the BBC Two adaptations of Henry IV, Parts I and II, and in 2013 he appeared as Professor Hilary Ambrose in Season 2, Episode 5 of the BBC One's Father Brown series. In 2016, he played the role of John Weir in the Netflix series The Crown.

Personal life 
 Laurenson had made his long-term home in the English market-town of Frome in Somerset.

Acting roles
Women in Love (1969)- Minister
The Magic Christian (1969)- Oxford crewman, uncredited
Elizabeth R (1971, TV)- Jean de Simier
Assault (1971)- Greg Lomax
Boney (1971–72, TV series)- Detective Inspector Bonaparte (Boney)
The Shadow of the Tower (1972, TV)- Earl of Lincoln
Space: 1999: Catacombs of the Moon (1976, TV)- Patrick Osgood
 Esther Waters (1977, TV) - William LatchHammer House of Horror: Rude Awakening (1980, TV)- Mr. RayburnThe Monster Club (1980)- Raven (The Shadmock)Pink Floyd – The Wall (1982)- Pink's FatherHeartbreakers (1984)- Terry RayInspector Morse: The Dead of Jericho (1987, TV)- TonyThe Man Who Fell to Earth (1987, TV movie)- Felix HawthorneThe Bourne Identity (1988, TV)- Gillette (2 episodes)Countdown to War (1989, TV)- Count CianoThe Man Inside (1990)- MuellerSharpe (1993, TV)- Hector Ross (5 episodes)A House in the Hills (1993)- Ronald RankinMidsomer Murders (2000, TV), “Beyond the Grave” - James TateSilent Witness: Beyond Guilt (2003, TV)- Professor Peter SachsDalziel and Pascoe: Soft Touch (2004, TV)- Richard MattisHenry IV, Parts I and II (2012, TV)- Earl of WestmorelandThe Crown (2016, TV)- Doctor Weir, recurring role, 5 episodesFather Brown (2014, 2017,  TV), S2E6 “The Mystery Of The Rosary” (2014) - Professor Hilary Ambrose, S5E10 "The Alchemist's Secret" (2017) Professor Hilary AmbroseEndeavour: Game (2017,  TV)- Professor George AmoryQuacks (2017, TV), “The Bishop’s Appendix”, Mr. AgarThe Terror'' (2018, TV) - Episode: “Go for Broke”, “Punished as a Boy” - Sir John Barrow

References

External links 

Interview with James Laurenson

1940 births
Living people
Logie Award winners
New Zealand emigrants to the United Kingdom
New Zealand male television actors
People from Marton, New Zealand